Count György Andrássy de Csíkszentkirály et Krasznahorka (February 5, 1797 – December 19, 1872) was a Hungarian nobleman, Imperial and Royal Chamberlain, Privy Councillor, Master of Cup-bearers, Chairman of the Tisza Rail Track Corporation and Upper Hungary Mining Association. He served as judge royal from 1863 to 1865.

He was one of the founders of the Hungarian Academy of Sciences. He supported the creation of that scientific organization with 10 500 Ft.

Works
 Gróf Andrássy Györgynek és gróf Széchenyi Istvánnak a budapesti hid-egyesülethez irányzott jelentése, midőn külföldről visszatérének. Pozsony, 1833. (Hungarian and German language)
 Budapestnek árviz ellen megóvásáról. Pest, 1845.

Family
He married Franciska Königsegg-Aulendorfi in 1834. They had four children (including Dénes Andrássy).

External links
 József Szinnyei: Magyar írók élete és munkái I. (Aachs–Bzenszki). Budapest. Hornyánszky. 1891.

1797 births
1872 deaths
Hungarian politicians
Judges royal
Members of the Hungarian Academy of Sciences
Gyorgy
Politicians from Košice